Scott Douglas Cunningham (June 27, 1956 – March 28, 1993) was an American writer. Cunningham is the author of several books on Wicca and various other alternative religious subjects.

His work Wicca: A Guide for the Solitary Practitioner, is one of the most successful books on Wicca ever published; he was a friend of notable occultists and Wiccans such as Raymond Buckland, and was a member of the Serpent Stone Family, and received his Third Degree Initiation as a member of that coven.

Early life
Scott Cunningham was born at the William Beaumont Hospital in Royal Oak, Michigan, USA, the second son of Chester Grant Cunningham and Rose Marie Wilhoit Cunningham. The family moved to San Diego, California in the fall of 1959 due to Rose Marie's health problems. The doctors in Royal Oak declared the mild climate in San Diego ideal for her. Outside of many trips to Hawaii, Cunningham lived in San Diego all his life.

Cunningham had one older brother, Greg, and a younger sister, Christine. Scott was openly gay for much of his life.

He studied creative writing at San Diego State University, where he enrolled in 1978. After two years in the program, however, he had more published works than several of his professors and dropped out of the university to write full-time. During this period he had as a roommate, magical author Donald Michael Kraig and often socialized with witchcraft author Raymond Buckland, who was also living in San Diego at the time.

Wicca
In 1980, Cunningham began initiate training under Raven Grimassi and remained as a first-degree initiate until 1982 when he left the tradition to pursue a solo practice of witchcraft.

Cunningham practiced a fairly basic interpretation of Wicca, often worshiping alone, though his book series for solitaries describes several instances in which he worshiped with friends and teachers.

He also believed that Wicca, which had been a closed tradition since the 1950s, should become more open to newcomers.

Cunningham was also drawn to Huna and a range of new age movements and concepts that influenced and colored his spirituality.

Death
In 1983, Scott Cunningham was diagnosed with lymphoma, which he successfully overcame. In 1990, while on a speaking tour in Massachusetts, he suddenly fell ill and was diagnosed with AIDS-related cryptococcal meningitis. He suffered from several infections and died in March 1993. He was 36.

Published works

Books
1980 – Shadow of Love (fiction)
1982 – Magical Herbalism: The Secret Craft of the Wise
1983 – Earth Power: Techniques of Natural Magic
1985 – Cunningham's Encyclopedia of Magical Herbs
1987 – The Magical Household: Spells and Rituals for the Home (with David Harrington)
1987 – Cunningham's Encyclopedia of Crystal, Gem, and Metal Magic
1988 – The Truth About Witchcraft Today
1988 – Wicca: A Guide for the Solitary Practitioner
1989 – The Complete Book of Incense, Oils & Brews
1989 – Magical Aromatherapy: The Power of Scent
1991 – Earth, Air, Fire, and Water: More Techniques of Natural Magic
1991 – The Magic in Food
1993 – Cunningham's Encyclopedia of Wicca in the Kitchen
1993 – Divination For Beginners
1993 – Living Wicca: A Further Guide for the Solitary Practitioner
1993 – Spell Crafts: Creating Magical Objects (with David Harrington)
1993 – The Truth About Herb Magic
1994 – The Truth About Witchcraft
1995 – Hawaiian Magic and Spirituality
1997 – Pocket Guide to Fortune Telling
1999 – Dreaming the Divine: Techniques for Sacred Sleep
2009 – Cunningham's Book of Shadows: The Path of An American Traditionalist – A rediscovered manuscript written by Cunningham in the late 1970s or early 1980s.

Art by Robin Wood
Several of Scott's books include black and white drawings and (in some editions) cover art by the Wiccan artist Robin Wood. Among these books are Magical Herbalism, Earth Power, and Earth, Air, Fire, Water.

Videos
Herb Magic

Film references

Never Say Macbeth, a 2007 film, is based around a group of actors who battle the curse of Macbeth by using Scott's book, Wicca: A Guide for the Solitary Practitioner. This film was released on DVD by Vanguard Cinema in August 2008.

See also

Modern paganism and New Age
Witch

Notes

References
Several of Scott's own books contain autobiographical text.

Rosemary Ellen Guiley, The Encyclopedia of Witches & Witchcraft.
Raven Grimassi, Encyclopedia of Wicca & Witchcraft.

External links
 Scott Cunningham at Llewellyn Worldwide (his publisher)

1956 births
1993 deaths
American occult writers
American Wiccans
American LGBT writers
AIDS-related deaths in Massachusetts
LGBT Wiccans
20th-century American non-fiction writers
20th-century American male writers
American male non-fiction writers
Wiccan writers
New Age writers
20th-century American LGBT people